Dead Weather Machine (sometimes abbreviated to DWM) is the second album by dark ambient artist SleepResearch Facility, and is the first of a two-part set, the second part being Dead Weather Machine Re:Heat (also known as DWM Re:Heat).

Overview 
The album is summarised by the text on its cover:

As an exercise in sample manipulation, DWM draws exclusively from source audio generated by swinging a cheap microphone in front of a misfiring heating unit, itself congested with the fibrous dust of advanced decrepitude and exhuming a near death-rattle from its fractured internal respiritory systems.

SleepResearch_Facility made a three-minute recording of the Tango2 heater (manufactured by Dimplex Heating Ltd), and created DWM and DWM Re:Heat from it, "using only about three or four very powerful pieces of software to mutate and mix/layer the sound". The manipulation is so thorough and extensive that it's impossible to guess the original source of the sounds. For listeners who are interested, the original recording is included as a hidden track at the end of the album, and a photo of the inside of the heater was available from the Audio Project Archive page of the official website. More detailed information about the album's creation can be found in the Foreshadow Magazine interview with SleepResearch_Facility.

The promotional text for the album, written by Manifold Records, encourages the listener to imagine being shrunk to microscopic size and "trekking through some enormous, dying mechanical landscape, the sounds of world-sized storms swirling all around you". The album's overall sound is very dark and deep, industrial and mechanical, impersonal and unemotional. The album's main aural components are: smooth noise in various forms, rumbling bass, and droning chords (particularly in "2.5" and "2.7"). At times, the sound is more structured, such as a steady rhythmic element in "2.5" (sounding rather like a dripping water tap), random bleeping sequences in "2.2", and a regular heavy reverberating booming in "2.3". Each track flows smoothly into the next, with no gaps of silence in-between, and as with all of SleepResearch_Facility's music, DWM is very sleep-conducive if played at low volume.

The original release in 2004 was a limited edition – only 1000 copies were manufactured.

Track listing 

(*) Follows "2.7" after 6:30 of silence

The following text is printed on the back of the CD box: "untitled x 7 + 1 hidden = sum", indicating that the seven main tracks have no official titles. However, on the back of the CD cover, the numbers "2.1" to "2.7" are printed, together with the duration of each corresponding track in minutes and seconds. This suggests that "2.1" to "2.7" are potential titles for the seven tracks. The use of the digit 2 at the beginning of each title may well be a reference to the fact that DWM is the second album by SleepResearch_Facility.

Miscellaneous CD text 
The following phrases are printed either on the inside of the CD tray, or in the CD booklet:
 [working with finite sound sources reinforces concepts of liberation through limitation]
 [passage through the digital domain spawns interesting new paradigms]
 55.8 -75.3
 all noise integral
 00.76-847-5-52
 further data added upon subsequent iterations
 patience is a game worth playing.

Response and public exposure 

Steve Roach, a highly respected ambient musician, has written a very complimentary review of DWM on his website, and even sold the album from his online store while stocks lasted. The album has also been highly praised by Aural Pressure, a website specialising in dark ambient, experimental, industrial, rhythmic noise, power electronics and neoclassical music.

In 2005, some of the album was broadcast on Dutch Radio 4FM (now known as NPS Studio 6).

Free audio 

The Audio Project Archive page of the official website links to the following relevant MP3 files:

A 60-second sample of "2.1" is available from the Manifold Records website, although the page incorrectly indicates that the sample is taken from "2.2".

Hungbunny's 50th podcast, Silence is Golden, begins with "2.1".

External links 
 Info from official site
 Info from Manifold Records site
 Discogs entry
 Rate Your Music entry

References 

2004 albums